The C-SPAN news and interview program Washington Journal has been presented live every day of the year from January 4, 1995, through the present, with very few exceptions. Programs are typically a mix of politically themed interviews, viewer calls and emails, discussion of current events, and reviews of that morning's newspapers.

In the table below, guests are listed in alphabetical order, rather than the order in which they appeared on the program. They are also listed with the position or affiliation they held at the time of their appearance.

Table of programs

References

 02
February 1995 events in the United States